Zappia is a surname. Notable people with the surname include:
 John Zappia, Australian drag racer
 Mariangela Zappia (born 1959), Italian diplomat